The 2009 North American Christmas blizzard was a powerful winter storm and severe weather event that affected the Midwestern United States, Great Plains, Southeastern United States, the Eastern Seaboard, and parts of Ontario. The storm began to develop on December 22 before intensifying to produce extreme winds and precipitation by the morning of December 24. The storm's rapid development made it difficult for forecasters to predict. The blizzard was reported to have claimed at least 21 lives, and disrupted air travel during the Christmas travel season. In the Southeastern and Central United States, an outbreak of 28 tornadoes occurred between December 23–24. The storm, a Category 5 "Extreme" one on the Regional Snowfall Index scale, was the first winter weather event to rank as such since the North American blizzard of 1996.

Impact

Snowfall
Snowfall varied across the United States. In Minnesota,  was received near Pequaywan Lake on the state's North Shore. Snowfall in Nebraska caused six deaths. In Oklahoma, a state of emergency was declared after blizzard conditions killed 3 people and dropped  of snow. Iowa saw high snowfall as well.

The storm was so intense that it wrapped warm air around the north and west side of it and cold air and snow blew in from the south. Rochester, Minnesota, in the northern half of the storm, saw rain with temperatures in the mid 30s Fahrenheit (~2°C) while snow was falling just to the west in a  band stretching from Canada south to at least Dallas, Texas, giving that region its first "White Christmas" since 1929. I-29 was completely closed in North and South Dakota, and then in stretches into Missouri.

Rain
Heavy rain in parts of the Midwest prompted the National Weather Service to issue Flood Warnings for many areas. Freezing rain fell across Iowa and Illinois, affecting travel to and from O'Hare International Airport. The Chicago area saw as much as ten inches of snow following the freezing rain and sleet.

Tornado outbreak
Several houses were destroyed near Lafayette, Louisiana, possibly by a tornado. Near Longview, Texas an EF2 tornado left a path of destruction nearly one mile long. Another tornado near Lufkin, Texas produced EF3 damage and caused two injuries.

Confirmed tornadoes

December 23 event

December 24 event

See also
Global storm activity of 2009
December 2009 North American blizzard
February 2009 Great Britain and Ireland snowfall
East Asian snowstorms of 2009-2010
East Asian snowstorms of late 2009
December 2009 North American snowstorms
List of North American tornadoes and tornado outbreaks

Notes

References

Blizzards in the United States
Blizzards in Canada
2009 meteorology
2009 natural disasters in the United States
2009 disasters in Canada
Natural disasters in Arkansas
Tornadoes in Louisiana
Natural disasters in Minnesota
Natural disasters in Nebraska
Natural disasters in North Dakota
Natural disasters in Oklahoma
Natural disasters in South Dakota
Tornadoes in Texas
Tornadoes in Mississippi
2009–10 North American winter
December 2009 events in North America
F3 tornadoes